On November 4, 2008, the District of Columbia held an election for its non-voting House delegate representing the District of Columbia's at-large congressional district. The winner of the race was incumbent Eleanor Holmes Norton (D).

The delegate is elected for two-year terms. This election coincided with the 2008 U.S. presidential election.

Candidates 
Incumbent Delegate Eleanor Holmes Norton, a Democrat, sought re-election for a 10th full term to the United States House of Representatives. She launched her re-election campaign with an announcement at the Eastern Market playground on May 10, 2008.

Norton was opposed by Green Party candidate Maude Hills and Seth Dellinger, a candidate for the Socialist Workers Party. The incumbent won reelection with over 85% of the vote.

Results

See also
 United States House of Representatives elections in the District of Columbia

References

United States House of Representatives
District of Columbia
2008